Phlebotaenia is a genus of flowering plants belonging to the family Polygalaceae.

Its native range is Caribbean.

Species:

Phlebotaenia cowellii 
Phlebotaenia cuneata

References

Polygalaceae
Fabales genera